Jackson Township is a township in Snyder County, Pennsylvania, United States. The population was 1,584 at the 2020 census.

Geography

Jackson Township is bordered by Union County to the north, Monroe Township to the east, Penn and Middlecreek Townships to the south and Center Township to the west.

The census-designated place of Kratzerville is in the southeastern corner of the township.

Demographics

As of the census of 2000, there were 1,276 people, 459 households, and 379 families residing in the township. The population density was 84.7 people per square mile (32.7/km2). There were 524 housing units at an average density of 34.8/sq mi (13.4/km2). The racial makeup of the township was 98.43% White, 0.71% African American, 0.24% Asian, 0.47% from other races, and 0.16% from two or more races. Hispanic or Latino of any race were 0.71% of the population.

There were 459 households, out of which 32.0% had children under the age of 18 living with them, 72.1% were married couples living together, 7.4% had a female householder with no husband present, and 17.4% were non-families. 14.4% of all households were made up of individuals, and 5.4% had someone living alone who was 65 years of age or older. The average household size was 2.78 and the average family size was 3.04.

In the township the population was spread out, with 24.9% under the age of 18, 9.1% from 18 to 24, 28.3% from 25 to 44, 26.0% from 45 to 64, and 11.7% who were 65 years of age or older. The median age was 39 years. For every 100 females there were 100.6 males. For every 100 females age 18 and over, there were 94.7 males.

The median income for a household in the township was $33,611, and the median income for a family was $36,250. Males had a median income of $28,482 versus $20,938 for females. The per capita income for the township was $15,131. About 6.0% of families and 8.9% of the population were below the poverty line, including 15.1% of those under age 18 and 10.1% of those age 65 or over.

Government

The polling place for Jackson Township is located in the Zion Lutheran Church in Kratzerville.

References

External links
Hazardous Air Pollutant Report 
Central Susquehanna Valley Thruway
County government directory

1745 establishments in Pennsylvania
Populated places established in 1745
Townships in Snyder County, Pennsylvania